The Sefton Dunes are located on the Sefton Coast in North-West England.

Sefton Dunes may also refer to:
Sefton Coast
Metropolitan Borough of Sefton
Sefton Council

or Sand Dunes & Coastal management in particular
Dune
Coastal management